Myshukur Rahaman (born 10 December 1991), also known as Maisuqur Rahman, is a Bangladeshi cricketer who plays for Dhaka Division in domestic cricket. He is a right-handed batsman and occasional right-arm medium pace bowler.

References

1991 births
Living people
Bangladeshi cricketers
Sylhet Division cricketers
Rajshahi Division cricketers
Dhaka Division cricketers
Kala Bagan Cricket Academy cricketers
Sheikh Jamal Dhanmondi Club cricketers
Bangladesh North Zone cricketers
Bangladesh under-23 cricketers
Brothers Union cricketers